Pate, pâté, or paté may refer to:

Foods

Pâté 'pastry'
 Pâté,  various French meat forcemeat pies or loaves
 Pâté haïtien or Haitian patty, a meat-filled puff pastry dish
 Pate or paté (anglicized spellings), the Virgin Islands version of empanadas, a meat or vegetable-filled fried-dough dish

Pâte 'dough'

 Pate, pâte, or paste, the body of cheese excluding the rind
  Pâte à choux, a kind of choux pastry

Places
Pate, Cambodia
Pate Island, also seat of a former Pate Sultanate, in Kenya

Other
 Pate (instrument), a Samoan percussion instrument
 Pate (surname), a surname
 Pâté (film), a film by Agnieszka Wojtowicz-Vosloo
Patē, the Māori name for the tree Schefflera digitata
 Pate, the surface of the human head, especially a bald head

See also
 Pasty (disambiguation)